Najafabad (also Romanized as Najafābād; also known as  Najimābād and Najmābād) is a village in Hakimabad Rural District, in the Central District of Zarandieh County, Markazi Province, Iran. At the 2006 census, its population was 164, in 37 families.

References 

Populated places in Zarandieh County